Bruce Jones was a founding pioneer in the surfboard shaping industry.

The company he founded, Bruce Jones Surfboards, has built premium surfboards since 1973.

Jones developed his skills by working with industry pioneers Hobart Alter founder of Hobie, Gordon Duane founder of Gordie Surfboards, and Dick Brewer founder of Dick Brewer Surfboards.  Jones still shaped all of his company's boards until his death.

Early years
Bruce Jones had been surfing since the age of 15, and his love for the sport and interest in the art of building boards suggested to him that he pursue this as a career choice. It turned out to be a good decision.

Jones started in the gluing room for Hobie Surfboards.

As the gluing room was right next to the shaping room, he had exposure to the finest shapers in the world at that time. Among them were Terry Martin, Ralph Parker, Dale Velzy and the legendary Phil Edwards. With some careful screening from Edwards, it was not long before Jones moved into shaping full-time.

Jones worked his way into rough shaping and then into the actual shaping room and lost no time in getting help from everyone involved.

More experience
In the mid to late 1960s, Jones moved to Huntington Beach, California, where he shaped for Vardeman Surfboards, doing all the Jackie Baxter Models, which to this day are considered rare collector's items, being the first board on the west coast to combine the low tail rails of the Hawaiian gun (for speed), with a refined longboard outline and eventually a turned down, flat-bottom nose for superb nose riding (influenced by the famous Morey/Pope John Peck Penetrator model).

At night, he would shape for Gordie Surfboards. Gordie (Gordon Duane) had a reputation for being a superb craftsman but very hard to get along with. Jones put up with him and learned some of Gordie's shaping techniques and most of all his dedication to perfection through using these techniques. He did a short stint with Dick Brewer in 1969, ghost shaping for him on Maui. He then went on to shape for Russell Surfboards, Newport Beach, California, and then Ole Surfboards in Sunset Beach, California, from where he launched his own business.

Also during this time (1970) Jones received a bachelor's degree in economics from California State University, Long Beach.

Bruce Jones Surfboards
He opened Bruce Jones Surfboards on September 15, 1973. In 1974, he moved the shaping and manufacturing portion of his business to Costa Mesa, California, where it remains today, albeit closed. In the mid-1980s, Jones demolished the old shop and built the new store, which officially opened January 1, 1986  and closed in late December 2014.

Present day
To this day, the Bruce Jones Surf Shop in Sunset Beach stands as a testament to the vision that a true surf shop can survive, even amongst the giant surf mega stores that have more or less taken over the surf retail business. Put out a quality product and give friendly one-on-one service and it will flourish.

Jones died on January 13, 2014, of a heart attack at the age of 68. A paddle-out ceremony (friends and family sitting on surfboards in the ocean holding hands as a tribute) was held March 9, 2014.

Recognition
One of the things that I admire about Bruce is that he is one of the few shapers who can still create his boards totally by hand, without the use of the "shaping" machines that are in common use. He shapes all kinds of boards, from longboards to shortboards to big wave guns to "fish."

"He is a master. And as long as I have known him, he has always remained a mellow and genuinely nice dude."

"When he opened his shop (Bruce Jones Surfboards) on Pacific Coast Highway in Huntington Beach, it became an iconographic part of the surf scene...He was a laid-back, super-together guy, and the shop reflected his persona.”

References

External links
 Official Website:Bruce Jones Surfboards

2014 deaths
American sports businesspeople
American sports executives and administrators
California State University, Long Beach alumni
Year of birth missing